Kathalo Rajakumari is an Indian Telugu television series which now airs on Star Maa. Madhusudan and Ashika Gopal Padukone are the main protagonists of the series. The show has consistently topped the ratings chart since its inception. The show is the remake of Bengali television series Ke Apon Ke Por which is being aired on Star Jalsha.

Plot 
Circumstances lead Avani, a maid to marry Akshay, the Singapore returned son of RadhaKrishna. Her problems escalate as she struggles to become a deserving daughter-in-law in her new household. How she manages to prove herself forms the crux of the story.

Cast 
 Madhusudhan as Jagarlamoodi Akshay: Avani's husband; Radhakrishna and Sulochana's son; Sudansh, Mithra, Charu and Subadhra's brother; Pavani's former love interest
 Ashika Gopal Padukone as Jagarlamoodi Avani: Akshay's wife; The maid turned daughter-in-law of Jagarlamoodi family.
 Anusha Reddy as Pavani Kuchupudi: Akshay's former love interest and Obsessive lover
 Anil Allam as Jagarlamoodi Radhakrishna: Sulochana's husband; Sudhansh, Mithra, Charu, Akshay and Subadhra's father; Swarna, Hasini and Avani's father-in-law
 Niharika as Jagarlamoodi Sulochana Devi: Radhakrishna's wife; Sudhansh, Mithra, Charu, Akshay and Subadhra's mother; Swarna, Hasini and Avani's mother-in-law
 Kalyan as Jagarlamoodi Sudhansh: Swarna's husband; Radhakrishna and Sulochana's elder son; Mithra, Charu, Akshay and Subadhra's brother
 Madhu Reddy as Jagarlamoodi Swarnamukhi "Swarna": Sudhansh's wife; Radhakrishna and Sulochana's elder daughter-in-law
 Sudeera as Jagarlamoodi Subadhra: Radhakrishna and Sulochana's daughter; Sudhansh, Mithra, Charu, Akshay's sister
 Sushma Reddy as Jagarlamoodi Hasini: Mithra's wife
 Hritesh as Jagarlamoodi Mithra: Hasini's husband; Radhakrishna and Sulochana's son; Sudhansh, Charu, Akshay and Subadhra's brother

References

Telugu-language television shows
2018 Indian television series debuts
2020 Indian television series endings
Star Maa original programming